Elections to Chichester District Council in West Sussex, United Kingdom were held on 5 May 1983.

The whole council was up for election and resulted in a Conservative majority.

Election result

|}

Ward results

References

1976 English local elections
1983
1970s in West Sussex